Pleurodema thaul, the Chilean four-eyed frog is a species of frog in the family Leptodactylidae.
It is found in Argentina and Chile.
Its natural habitats are subantarctic forests, temperate forests, temperate shrubland, temperate grassland, rivers, intermittent rivers, swamps, freshwater lakes, intermittent freshwater lakes, freshwater marshes, intermittent freshwater marshes, pastureland, plantations, rural gardens, urban areas, water storage areas, ponds, open excavations, sewage treatment areas, irrigated land, seasonally flooded agricultural land, and introduced vegetation.
It is threatened by habitat loss.

Individuals vary in size between 3 and 5 cm. They feed on insects and spiders.  Reproduction occurs almost throughout the year. In Chile they are found from the Antofagasta region to the Aysén Region, while in Argentina they live in areas close to the Andes in the provinces of Neuquén, Rio Negro, and Chubut.

References

Lenz, Rudolf. Diccionario etimológico de las voces chilenas derivadas de lenguas indígenas americanas (1904) .

Pleurodema
Amphibians of Argentina
Amphibians of Chile
Amphibians of Patagonia
Taxonomy articles created by Polbot
Amphibians described in 1826